Ho-Pin Tung (born December 4, 1982) is a Chinese-Dutch racing driver who races with a Chinese license.

Career
Born in Velp, Gelderland, Netherlands, Tung started kart racing in the Netherlands in 1997 before graduating to single-seaters. In 2001 he raced in the Dutch Formula Ford championship with Van Amersfoort Racing. After winning the 2003 Formula BMW Asia series, he was rewarded with a test drive with the Williams F1 team.

In 2004, he joined the ATS Formel 3 Cup. Although he scored race wins and podium finishes, he finished 7th in his rookie year.

Tung stayed in the ATS F3 Cup in 2005, finishing the series in third place, before taking the title in 2006, winning 9 races, 4 pole positions and 5 fastest laps.

At the 2007 Chinese Grand Prix he was announced as a BMW Sauber test driver for the rest of the year.

On 4 April 2007, BCN Competición announced that it had signed Tung as its second driver alongside Japanese driver Sakon Yamamoto for the 2007 GP2 series.

Tung drove for Trident Racing team in the 2008 GP2 Asia Series and GP2 Series, scoring his first podium finish in the latter.

In 2009, he raced in the Superleague Formula series. He raced in the first three rounds for Galatasaray S.K. and the latter three rounds for Atlético Madrid. He had his first win in the series at the Jarama round for Galatasaray.

In December 2009, Tung tested for the Renault F1 Team. In January he was announced as the team's third driver. As part of the deal, he returned to the GP2 Series with the DAMS team for the 2010 season.

On 23 June 2010, the FIA granted Tung a four-race probationary super license, allowing him to compete in Formula One.

At the Hungaroring round of the GP2 season, Tung sustained a minor fracture of one of his lumbar vertebrae as a result of a first-lap collision with Jules Bianchi, who spun in front of him and suffered a more serious break of the same bone. Tung was replaced by Romain Grosjean while he recovered. However, Grosjean kept the seat for the remainder of the season, leaving Tung without a drive until he was called up to replace Christian Vietoris at Racing Engineering for the final round, Vietoris suffering from appendicitis.

IndyCar
On 22 November 2010, Tung made sporting history as he officially became the first Chinese licensed driver to take the wheel of an IndyCar by testing with the FAZZT Race Team at Sebring International Raceway.

Tung attempted to qualify for the 2011 Indianapolis 500 with Dragon Racing, but was unsuccessful due to a crash on Pole Day that resulted in a mild concussion. He made his IndyCar debut later that season in August at Infineon Raceway driving for the same team.

Sportscars

In 2016, Tung joined Baxi DC Racing to partner team owner David Cheng and French driver Nelson Panciatici (replaced mid-year by Paul-Loup Chatin) in the team's Alpine A460 entry for the LMP2 class of the 2016 FIA World Endurance Championship. The team took a string of minor points placings during the year, and Tung finished the season in 13th position in the drivers' championship standings.

Tung remained with DC, now renamed Jackie Chan DC Racing, for the 2017 FIA World Endurance Championship. At the 2017 24 Hours of Le Mans, Tung became the first driver in the event's history to lead the race in an LMP2 car, after all the top class LMP1 entries either retired or faded away in the race. Ultimately, his Oreca 07 car finished second overall, and first in the LMP2 class, after it was overtaken by the number 2 Porsche 919 Hybrid car. The Jackie Chan DC crew were also the first Chinese-entered car to win a class in the 24 Hours of Le Mans. During the remainder of the season, Tung and his co-drivers Oliver Jarvis and Thomas Laurent took further class wins at Silverstone and the Nürburgring, and two other podium finishes, and finished the season in second place in the LMP2 championship.

Tung remained with Jackie Chan DC Racing for a third season in 2018, to contest the 2018-19 FIA World Endurance Championship 'superseason'.

Racing record

Complete A1 Grand Prix results
(key)

Complete GP2 Series results
(key)

Complete GP2 Asia Series results
(key)

Superleague Formula
(Races in bold indicate pole position)

American Open-Wheel racing results
(key)

IndyCar

Indianapolis 500

Complete GT1 World Championship results

24 Hours of Le Mans results

Complete WeatherTech SportsCar Championship results
(key) (Races in bold indicate pole position; races in italics indicate fastest lap.)

Complete FIA World Endurance Championship results

Complete Formula E results
(key)

References

External links
 

1982 births
Living people
People from Rheden
Sportspeople from Gelderland
Dutch people of Chinese descent
Chinese racing drivers
Dutch racing drivers
A1 Team China drivers
Formula BMW Asia drivers
British Formula Three Championship drivers
German Formula Three Championship drivers
GP2 Asia Series drivers
GP2 Series drivers
Superleague Formula drivers
IndyCar Series drivers
FIA GT Championship drivers
FIA GT1 World Championship drivers
FIA World Endurance Championship drivers
24 Hours of Le Mans drivers
International GT Open drivers
24 Hours of Spa drivers
Formula E drivers
WeatherTech SportsCar Championship drivers
Asian Le Mans Series drivers
24 Hours of Daytona drivers
Trident Racing drivers
DAMS drivers
Racing Engineering drivers
Dragon Racing drivers
KCMG drivers
OAK Racing drivers
NIO 333 FE Team drivers
A1 Grand Prix drivers
Campos Racing drivers
Team Meritus drivers
De Villota Motorsport drivers
Alan Docking Racing drivers
Jota Sport drivers
Van Amersfoort Racing drivers
Hitech Grand Prix drivers